Pęciszewo  is a village in the administrative district of Gmina Braniewo, within Braniewo County, Warmian-Masurian Voivodeship, in northern Poland, close to the border with the Kaliningrad Oblast of Russia.

The village has a population of 79.

Notable residents
 Helmut Echternach (1907-1988), Lutheran theologian and pastor

References

Villages in Braniewo County